Darren Jackson (born 7 December 1961) is a former Australian rules footballer who played with Geelong in the Victorian Football League (VFL).

A full-forward from Finley, Jackson came to Geelong after winning the Murray Football League's leading goal-kicker award in 1983. He made two senior appearances for Geelong in the 1984 VFL season, against Collingwood at Kardinia Park in round seven and Essendon at Waverley Park in round eight.

Jackson went on to have a long and decorated career at Finley, being the Murray Football League leading-kicker a further three times, in 1986, 1989 and 1997. He also had a stint with South Australian National Football League (SANFL) club South Adelaide.

In 2015 Jackson took on the role of Senior Coach for the Northern Jests (Ardlethan/Ariah Park/Mirrool) in the Farrer Football League.

References

1961 births
Australian rules footballers from New South Wales
Geelong Football Club players
South Adelaide Football Club players
Finley Football Club players
Living people